Samuel Chapman Massingale (August 2, 1870 – January 17, 1941) was an American politician and a U.S. Representative from Oklahoma.

Biography
Born in Quitman, Mississippi, Massingale was the son of George M. and Martha McGowan Massingale, and attended the public schools and the University of Mississippi at Oxford where he studied law.

Career
Massingale moved to Fort Worth, Texas in 1887 and was employed for a short time as a section hand while he continued to study law. He was admitted to the bar in 1895 and commenced practice in Cordell, Oklahoma, in 1900.

During the Spanish–American War, Massingale served as a private in Company D, Second Texas Infantry. He served as a member of the Oklahoma Territorial Council in 1902. The following year he married Anna Canaday, and they had four children. He ran unsuccessfully for the Sixtieth Congress in 1906.

Massingale was elected as a Democrat to the Seventy-fourth and to the three succeeding Congresses and served from January 3, 1935, until his death on January 17, 1941.

Death
Massingale died in Washington, D.C., January 17, 1941 (age 70 years, 168 days). He is interred in Lawnview Cemetery, Cordell, Oklahoma.

See also
 List of United States Congress members who died in office (1900–49)

References

External links

 

1870 births
1941 deaths
People from New Cordell, Oklahoma
United States Army soldiers
Burials in Oklahoma
Democratic Party members of the United States House of Representatives from Oklahoma
People from Quitman, Mississippi